Danas (Serbo-Croatian for "today") is a United Group-owned daily newspaper of record published in Belgrade, Serbia. It is a left-oriented media, promoting social-democracy and European Union integration. It is a vocal media supporter of Serbian NGO activities towards human rights and minorities protection.

History
The first issue of Danas appeared on 9 June 1997. It was established in 1997 after a group of discontented journalists from the Naša borba newspaper walked out after getting into a conflict with the paper's new private majority owner.

Right from the start the paper employed a strong independent editorial policy with respect to Milošević's regime. Because of open reporting and uncensored coverage on issues and events plaguing Yugoslav and Serbian society in the late 1990s, the paper often found itself targeted by Serbian authorities. Danas was one of the three newspapers (Dnevni telegraf and Naša borba being the other two) to be banned by governmental decree on 14 October 1998 for "spreading fear and defeatism" at a time when NATO bombing of FR Yugoslavia seemed a distinct possibility. As the threat of bombing went away (for a few months anyway), the ban was lifted on 20 October 1998, only to be replaced by a piece of legislation called the Information Law. Under that law, Danas was fined severely and on numerous occasions. The paper's day-to-day operations were often under threat of shutting down until the regime was finally overthrown on 5 October 2000.

In the period since the regime change, Danas has been one of the rare Serbian newspapers (or Serbian media outlets in general, for that matter) to ignore the commercial temptations of yellow journalism. Its circulation has been continually in decline. Most of the foreign investors in Serbian media market have been avoiding it. Danas currently publishes political comic strips drawn by the famous caricaturist Predrag Koraksić Corax.

Editorial history
Veseljko Koprivica (1997)
Grujica Spasović (1997–2006)
Mihal Ramač (2006–2009)
 (2009–2016)
 (since 2016)

Ownership and publishing
The paper is published and managed by an entity called Dan Graf d.o.o. - a limited liability company based in Belgrade. The company's ownership was previously shared by 6 individuals: Dušan Mitrović (26,67%), Zdravko Huber (24,22%), Radomir Ličina (20,92%), Vesna Ninković (13,94%), Grujica Spasović (11,10%), Rade Radovanović (3,15%). However, in March 2021, the company was sold to Luxembourg-based group United Media for 1,5 million USD.

See also
 List of newspapers in Serbia
 Media in Serbia

References

External links
 

Newspapers published in Serbia
Newspapers established in 1997
Mass media in Belgrade